is the sixth single by the all-girl J-pop group Berryz Kobo, released on March 30, 2005.

The single placed 7th in the Oricon Weekly Singles Chart,

It became the group's first single (or album) to rank in the Top 10 and also its first to sell over 20,000 copies. At that time, the group's average age was below 12 years.

Track listing

CD track list 
  (Music and lyrics: Tsunku. Arrangement: Magaino Kouji)
  (Music and lyrics: Tsunku. Arrangement: Suzuki "Daichi" Hideyuki)

Single V

References

External links 
 Profile at the Hello! Project official website

2005 singles
2005 songs
Piccolo Town singles
Songs written by Tsunku
Song recordings produced by Tsunku